The 1961–62 William & Mary Indians men's basketball team represented the College of William & Mary in intercollegiate basketball during the 1961–62 NCAA University Division men's basketball season. Under the fifth year of head coach Bill Chambers, the team finished the season 7–17 and 5–11 in the Southern Conference.

William & Mary played its home games on campus at Blow Gymnasium, with one home game played at the Norfolk Municipal Auditorium in Norfolk, Virginia. This was the 57th season of the collegiate basketball program at William & Mary, whose nickname is now the Tribe.

The Indians finished in 8th place in the conference and failed to qualified for the 1962 Southern Conference men's basketball tournament, held at the Richmond Arena. William & Mary did not participate in a post-season tournament.

Program notes
William & Mary played three teams for the first time this year: Texas Tech, Texas, and Loyola–New Orleans.

Schedule

|-
!colspan=9 style="background:#006400; color:#FFD700;"| Regular season

Source

References

William & Mary Tribe men's basketball seasons
William and Mary
William and Mary
William and Mary